James George Inglis (born 11 July 1951) is a Scottish former amateur football outside right who played in the Scottish League for Queen's Park. He was capped by Scotland at amateur level.

References 

Scottish footballers
Scottish Football League players
Queen's Park F.C. players
Association football outside forwards
Scotland amateur international footballers
1951 births
People from Hillhead
Living people